The Copa Raúl Colombo, was a friendly tournament realized between Argentina and Rio de Janeiro state team, on December 5, 1956. The competition was held to salute Raúl H. Colombo, newly elected president of the AFA. Colombo remained as president of the association until 1964.

In some lists, including the AFA's own match count and the World Football Elo Ratings, this match appears as a duel between Brazil and Argentina.

Match details

See also 
 Argentina national football team results (unofficial matches)
 Rio de Janeiro state football team results

References  

Argentina national football team matches
Rio de Janeiro state football team results
1956 in Brazilian football
1956 in Argentine football
International association football competitions hosted by Brazil
Defunct international association football competitions in South America